The BYD S8 is a convertible sports car manufactured by the Chinese car company BYD.  First shown as a prototype at the Shanghai Motor Show in 2006 as the F8.

Overview

The vehicle has a steel roof and the design shares similarities at the rear with the conceptually similar Renault Mégane CC while the front is reminiscent of the Mercedes-Benz CLK.

The BYD S8 is front-wheel drive and is powered by a 4-cylinder 2.0-litre engine. The S8 was mainly sold in China.

Sales
In 2009 the car sold in 96 units, and only seven cars were sold in the full 2010 fiscal year. Production has now ceased. In all, the car sold in only 103 units.

References

S8
2010s cars
Front-wheel-drive sports cars
Hardtop convertibles
Cars introduced in 2009